Theory & Psychology is a peer-reviewed academic journal that publishes papers in the field of Psychology. The journal's founding editor is Henderikus J Stam. The journal's current editor is Kieran C O'Doherty. It has been in publication since 1991 and is currently published by SAGE Publications.

Scope 
Theory & Psychology is a forum for theoretical and meta-theoretical analysis in Psychology. The journal publishes papers which focus on the emergent themes of contemporary psychological debate. Theory & Psychology is published six times a year and is aimed at a broad psychological audience, particularly those concerned with the evolution of Modern Psychology.

Abstracting and indexing 
Theory & Psychology is abstracted and indexed in, among other databases: SCOPUS, and the Social Sciences Citation Index. According to the Journal Citation Reports, its 2021 impact factor is 1.553, ranking it 105 out of 147 journals in the category ‘Psychology, multidisciplinary’.

References

External links 
 

SAGE Publishing academic journals
English-language journals
Bimonthly journals
Publications established in 1991
Psychology journals